The Copa del Generalísimo 1974 Final was the 72nd final of the King's Cup. It was played at Vicente Calderón Stadium in Madrid on 28 June 1974, with Real Madrid beating Barcelona 4–0 for their 12th title.

Details

See also
El Clásico

References

1974
Copa
FC Barcelona matches
Real Madrid CF matches
El Clásico matches